The Mexican spider monkey (Ateles geoffroyi vellerosus) is a subspecies of Geoffroy's spider monkey, a type of New World monkey, from Mexico and Central America, native to Mexico, Guatemala, Honduras, Nicaragua and El Salvador. It is described as being critically endangered by the IUCN, due to an 80% population decline in the last 45 years, mostly due to a large amount of habitat loss.

References

Spider monkeys
Monkey, Spider, Mexican
Monkey, Spider, Mexican
Monkey, Spider, Mexican
Monkey, Spider, Mexican
Taxa named by John Edward Gray
Mammals described in 1866